This is a List of old boys of St Peter's College, Adelaide, former students of the Anglican school, St Peter's College in Adelaide, South Australia, Australia.

Nobel laureates 
 Sir William Lawrence Bragg  , Nobel prize in Physics, 1915
 Howard Walter Florey, Baron Florey , Nobel prize in Physiology or Medicine, 1945
 J. Robin Warren , Nobel prize in Physiology or Medicine, 2005

Business 
 Sir James Hardy , three times America's Cup skipper and renowned winemaker
 Essington Lewis, prominent industrialist
 Frank Fancett Espie 1890-1962 Mining engineer, MD Western Mining Corporation, South Broken Hill etc.
 Sir Frank Espie , 1917-2004 Mining engineer Directorships Rio Tinto (Deputy Chair), Bougainville Copper Chair, CRA, Woodside, Westpac etc. Captain 2nd AIF, North Africa, Borneo 
 Paul Robertson Espie , born 1945, founder and Vice-Chairman of the Pacific Road Group (investment banking); Director (since 2011) and Chairman (since 2019) of Menzies Research Centre; and Chairman / Non-Executive Director of Empire Energy

Clergy 
 Ian George , former Archbishop of Adelaide
 Harold Eustace Sexton, former Archbishop of British Columbia

Entertainment and the arts 
 Walter Bagot, architect, founder of Woods Bagot
 Greg Champion, folk singer and songwriter
 Sam Clark, Neighbours actor and musician
 Keith Conlon , television and radio personality
 David Dridan, landscape painter, gallery director
 Francis Greenslade, actor,writer, translator 
 Scott Hicks, film director
 Peter Meakin, journalist and media executive
 Peter Muller , architect
 Tim Phillipps, actor

Judges, politicians, and public servants 
 Harold David Anderson , former ambassador
 John Bannon , Premier of South Australia, 1982–1992
 Sir Henry Barwell , Premier of South Australia, 1920–1924
 James Vincent Seaton Bowen, Lord Mayor of Adelaide, 1979–1981
 Sir John Cox Bray , Premier of South Australia, 1881–1884
 Sir Richard Butler, Premier of South Australia, 1905
 Sir John Downer , Premier of South Australia, 1885–1887 and 1892–1893
 Don Dunstan , Premier of South Australia, 1967–1968 and 1970–1979
 Sir Frederick Holder , Premier of South Australia, 1892 and 1899–1901
 Sir Denzil Ibbetson , administrator in British India, author
 George Leake , Premier of Western Australia, 1901 and 1901–1902
 Tom Lewis , Premier of New South Wales, 1975–1976
 Ian McLachlan , Australian Defence Minister, 1996–1998
 Sir George John Robert Murray , Chief Judge of the Supreme Court of South Australia (1916–1942)
 Sir John Northmore (judge) , Chief Justice of Western Australia from 1931 to 1945
 Sir Arthur Rymill, Lord Mayor of Adelaide, 1950–1953
 David Tonkin , Premier of South Australia, 1979–1982
 Guy Debelle , Deputy Governor, RBA, 2016-2022
 James Stevens, MP for Sturt, 2019-

Medicine and the sciences 
 Dr Michael Alpers, emeritus professor, biologist, medical researcher of prion diseases, kuru, and doctor in tropical infectious diseases.
 Sir Arthur Cudmore, Adelaide surgeon
 Dr Richard Harris, anaesthetist, 2019 Australian of the Year
 Dr Basil Hetzel ,  medical researcher
 Hugh Possingham, conservation and environmental planning expert, applied mathematician, academic
 Dr Andy Thomas, astronaut
 Sir Joseph Verco, physician and conchologist
 Professor Ravi Savarirayan, Human Geneticist, Rare diseases therapist

Military
Commander Francis Walter Belt , lawyer and explorer
 Brigadier Arthur Seaforth Blackburn , soldier and lawyer; awarded the Victoria Cross in 1916
 Colonel Harold Greenway , Croix de Guerre
 Colonel Guy George Egerton Wylly , army officer; awarded the Victoria Cross in 1900 (also attended The Hutchins School)

Sports
 Nathan Adcock, cricketer, former captain of Southern Redbacks
 Bryan Beinke, footballer, former player at Adelaide Football Club
 Michael Cranmer, cricketer, West End Redbacks
 Phil Davis, footballer, current player at Greater Western Sydney Giants
 John Flood, medical practitioner who played cricket for Ireland)
 Henry Frayne, Australian Olympian in 2012 and 2016 in the long jump
 Tom Harley, two time premiership captain with the Geelong Football Club; CEO of the Sydney Swans
 Will Hayward, current footballer at the Sydney Swans
 Riley Knight, footballer, current player at Adelaide Football Club
 Philip Lee, Test cricketer and footballer for Norwood
 Oscar McGuinness, Australian representative rower.
 Andrew McKay, former footballer Carlton Football Club
 Gillon McLachlan, CEO of the Australian Football League
 Hamish McLachlan, Australian sports broadcaster
 Will Minson, former footballer with the Western Bulldogs
 Lachie Neale, 2020 Brownlow Medallist, current footballer with the Brisbane Lions
 Darren Ng, basketballer, former player with the Adelaide 36ers Basketball Club
 Rod Owen-Jones, Olympian water polo player at the 2000 Summer Olympics, national team 1993–2000, and World Cup bronze medalist
 Alex Ross, current cricketer, West End Redbacks and Adelaide Strikers
 Hayden Stoeckel, Olympian swimmer and bronze and silver medalist at 2008 Summer Olympics
 Richard Twopeny, founder of the SANFL, captain of Adelaide (SAFA) and Port Adelaide and player with South Melbourne
 Dylan Stephens, AFL Footballer

References

External links
 St Peter's College

St Peter's College, Adelaide
St Peter's College Old Boys
St Peter's College, Adelaide
 *